Qızılağac (also, Kizil’-Agach, Kizyl-Agach, Kyzylagach, and Kyzylagadzh) is a village and municipality in the Masally Rayon of Azerbaijan.  It has a population of 5,152.

References 

Populated places in Masally District